Mary Travers (1936–2009) was an American singer-songwriter and member of the folk-pop group, Peter, Paul and Mary.

Mary Travers may also refer to:

 Mary Rose-Anna Travers (1894–1941), Québécoise singer known as Madame Bolduc or La Bolduc 
 Mary Travers (murder victim) (died 1984), victim of The Troubles murdered by IRA militant Mary McArdle
 Mary Travers Murphy (born 1958), former television journalist and politician
 Mary Widdicombe Travers (c. 1783–1854), Newfoundland entrepreneur and philanthropist